Shambhala: The Sacred Path of the Warrior is a book concerning the Shambhala Buddhist vision of founder Chögyam Trungpa.  The book discusses addressing personal and societal problems through the application of secular concepts such as basic goodness, warriorship, bravery, and egolessness as a means toward the creation of what he calls "enlightened society". Shambhala vision is described as a nonreligious approach rooted in meditation and accessible to individuals of any, or no, religion. In Shambhala terms, it is possible, moment by moment, for individuals to establish enlightened society.

External links
Glossary of Shambhala terms

1984 non-fiction books
Books about Buddhism
Books about spirituality
Shambhala Publications books
Tibetan Buddhism